Hillel: The Foundation for Jewish Campus Life, also known as Hillel International or Hillel, is the largest Jewish campus organization in the world, working with thousands of college students globally. Hillel is represented at more than 550 colleges and communities throughout North America and globally, including 30 communities in the former Soviet Union, nine in Israel, and five in South America. The organization is named after Hillel the Elder, a Jewish sage who moved from Babylonia to Judea in the 1st century and is known for his formulation of the Golden Rule.

History

In 1923, Edward Chauncey Baldwin, Christian professor of Biblical literature at University of Illinois at Urbana–Champaign was distressed by his Jewish students' lack of knowledge of the Hebrew Bible, and he discussed his concerns with Rabbi Benjamin Frankel.

Later the same year, members of the local Jewish and university communities met in a rented loft over a dry cleaner in Champaign, Illinois, and founded The Hillel Foundation.

In 1925, B'nai Brith pledged to sponsor Hillel's activities with a budget of approximately $12,000 that year. By then, it encompassed 120 Hillel foundations and affiliates at an additional 400 campuses. The campus foundations seek to create a welcoming environment for Jewish students on their respective campuses.

Beginning in 1988, under Director Richard M. Joel, Hillel underwent an organizational shift in mission and structure. An integral part of this shift was the institution of a Board of Governors, chaired by Edgar M. Bronfman until 2009 when he was succeeded by Randall Kaplan.

Bronfman's involvement began in 1994 during a visit by Richard Joel to the Seagram building, when Bronfman pledged his support to Hillel. When Bronfman agreed to serve as chairman, Hillel gained legitimacy among other philanthropists. The subsequent revitalization of the organization resulted in increased donor support, updated programming, and broad international recognition. Part of the increased donor support came as a result of Bronfman's well-known campus visits, beginning in 1994, that continued until his death in 2013.

Hillel has been described as the largest Jewish campus organization in the world. Hillel foundations are found in Israel, South America, and the Post-Soviet States, and affiliated organizations are found in 18 countries across North America, South America, Europe and the Middle East.

Although the foundation was not organized nationally until 1923, Texas A&M Hillel was founded in 1916 by Prof. Jacob and Mrs. Esther Taubenhaus as the Menorah Club. The Menorah Club then chose to affiliate with the national organization in the 1920s.
 

Other notable Hillels include Hillel at the University of Illinois at Urbana–Champaign, the first Hillel in the world, Columbia/Barnard Hillel, and University of Pennsylvania Hillel, whose Steinhardt Hall is the largest Hillel International building of any college or university in the country.

In 1924, University of Pennsylvania's first Jewish student organization was organized by  Philadelphia branch of the United Synagogue of America, Conservative Judaism's leading organization, and initially generically named   the Jewish Students’ Association at Penn and then, after the 1929 death of Louis Marshall, the Chairman of the Board of conservative Judaism's rabbinical college, Jewish Theological Seminary of America, it was renamed in his honor as the Louis Marshall Society but by January 1, 1944, when it merged with Hillel, it became known as Hillel and relocated to the “Jewish Students’ House” at 3613 Locust Street (at center of Penn's campus) and served as a dormitory, Kosher dining room and a social center for Penn's Jewish students.

Leadership 
Adam Lehman was appointed CEO of Hillel International in January 2020. He started at Hillel International as chief operating officer in October 2015. Lehman had been senior vice president at AOL. Skip Vichness is chair of Hillel International’s Board of Directors. Mimi Kravetz was hired in 2015 to serve as Chief Talent Officer and is currently Chief Experience Officer. She previously served as head of human resources marketing at Google.

Hillel International Presidents and CEOs have included Rabbi Benjamin Frankel (1925–1927); Abram L. Sachar (1933–1948); Richard M. Joel (1988–2003); Wayne Firestone (2005–2013);  and Eric Fingerhut (2013–2020).

Activities
Hillel International says its mission is “enriching the lives of Jewish students so that they may enrich the Jewish people and the world” through its on-campus network. More than 800 colleges and universities are connected to a local Hillel community that serves as a faith community, Jewish educational resource, social network and a place to develop leadership and professional skills. Hillel uses what it calls a relationship-based model to engage students in need of a community. 

Local or campus-based Hillels host a wide variety of programming from holding Shabbat worship and dinner on Friday nights, celebrating Jewish holidays, to offering classes in Jewish studies and Hebrew. Hillel provides a place for students to join together in volunteering and fundraising and provides resources for spiritual, emotional and physical well-being.

Hillel has no denominational affiliation, as compared to Chabad which represents Hasidic Judaism.

Hillel employs more than 1,200 people worldwide and provides extensive continuing education programs for its employees through a professional development program called Hillel U. The organization also invests in early career professionals through the Springboard Fellowship.  From 2011 to 2020, Hillel doubled its professional staff, from 575 to 1,200; the amount of funds raised, from about $90 million to about $185 million; and the number of students it reaches, from roughly 68,000 to more than 140,000.

In 1997, Jeremy Deutchman, a graduate of Hillel's JCSC fellowship and a student member of Hillel's board of directors, wrote a lengthy article in Tikkun. Deutchman states that Hillel engages in the wholesale "dumbing down" of Judaism, and providing stylish, yet meaningless Judaism instead of substantive Judaism. Deutchman says Hillel has been too similar to a massive corporation that franchises out simplistic templates to campus franchisees that removes the religious meaning of Judaism in favor of a meaningless commodity. Citing a Hillel-sponsored activity where several dozen students worked for hours constructing a sixty-pound matzoh ball, Deutchman calls it an example of where a "symbol triumphs over substance".

Policy position
Adam Lehman, Hillel International’s president and CEO, has called the organization, "radically pluralistic, inclusive, egalitarian home for Jewish students coming from all different backgrounds".

The organization imposes restrictions on activities; Hillel takes a firm stance in not promoting certain types of views on Israel, such as the Boycott, Divestment, and Sanctions campaign.

Hillel International and local Hillels play a role to fight anti-Semitism on college campuses. Hillel provides security training to local Hillels and engages in dialogue with university administrations about how to recognize and confront anti-Semitism on campus. Hillel has extensive pro-Israel programming and employs post-graduate fellows from Israel from the Jewish Agency for Israel.  Hillel is a major partner of the Birthright Israel program.

Intermarriage
Former Hillel president Avraham Infeld was challenged in traditional circles for asserting that Hillel accepts intermarriage—marriage of Jews to non-Jews. The organization has since created resources for Hillel professionals to work with students from multifaith homes. Hillel supports LGBTQ people and pluralism across the spectrum of Jewish movements.

BDS
Hillel's use of the motto "Wherever we stand, we stand with Israel" has been criticized as alienating to Jewish students who are critical of Israeli policies, as well as attaching political ideology to an otherwise religious group. According to Hillel's official guidelines, Hillel will not "partner with, house or host organizations, groups or speakers that delegitimize, demonize or apply a double standard to Israel."

A campaign called "Open Hillel" started at universities to discuss Hillel's pro-Israel stance. 
In 2016, four campus Hillels had indicated they were "Open," namely Guilford College, Swarthmore College, Vassar College, Wesleyan University. They rejected the Standards of Partnership that, they protested, limit dialog and freedom of speech. As of 2020, none of these four institutions had “open Hillel;” Guilford and Vassar remain affiliated with Hillel, and decided to abide by guidelines. Swarthmore and Wesleyan’s Jewish campus groups are not affiliated with Hillel. 

In December 2013, Swarthmore College Hillel became the first Open Hillel by declaring it will not abide by the international organization's Standards of Partnership, which prohibit Hillel chapters from hosting speakers or cosponsoring with student groups that support the Boycott, Divestment and Sanctions movement, hold Israel to a different standard or are deemed to "demonize or delegitimize" the state of Israel. In a statement from Swarthmore Hillel,  "All are welcome to walk through our doors and speak with our name and under our roof, be they Zionist, anti-Zionist, post-Zionist, or non-Zionist." In March 2015, Swarthmore Hillel's board voted to change the name of the organization after Hillel International threatened legal action if the student organization did not modify an upcoming event to meet Hillel International's Standards of Partnership, which does not allow anti-Israel speakers. The student group removed the word "Hillel" from its title so it could proceed with the planned event, and subsequently adopted the name "Swarthmore Kehilah", severing its association with Hillel.

In March 2015, the Student Board President of Muhlenberg College's Hillel resigned over Hillel's refusal to sponsor Open Hillel's "From Mississippi to Jerusalem: A Conversation with Civil Rights Veterans" event, bringing three Jewish veterans of the Civil Rights Movement to discuss their efforts on behalf of civil rights in the American South and in the Israel-Palestine conflict. Caroline Dorn, protesting Hillel's refusal to allow the civil rights veterans to speak at Hillel, said in her resignation: "I can’t be a representative of Hillel International, an organization that I feel is limiting free speech on our campus and prohibiting academic integrity." The event was held without the sponsorship of Hillel and had an estimated 100 attendees.

When Swarthmore protested Hillel's restrictions on free speech, Hillel President and Chief Executive Officer Eric Fingerhut said that it was "not acceptable" to host certain speakers under the Hillel banner, and that "anti-Zionists will not be permitted to speak using the Hillel name or under the Hillel roof, under any circumstances." Hillel International's rules prohibit Hillel campus chapters from hosting programs that include groups or individuals that "deny the right of Israel to exist as a Jewish and democratic state with secure and recognized boundaries; delegitimize, demonize or apply a double standard to Israel," or that support boycott, divestment or sanction campaigns against Israel. Harvard Hillel had barred Avraham Burg, a former speaker of the Knesset, from speaking because Burg's talk was cosponsored by Harvard Palestinian Solidarity Committee. Hillel guidelines currently bar liberal Peter Beinart, who supports limited boycott of products produced on West Bank settlements; linguist Noam Chomsky who supports a no-state solution , and Jewish philosopher Judith Butler, author of a radical critique of Zionism that rejects its moral legitimacy.

In February 2014, the Vassar College Jewish Union, an affiliate of Hillel, joined Swarthmore Hillel in declaring themselves to be an Open Hillel, and Wesleyan University's Hillel followed suit. Alumni at the University of California, Berkeley have also created a petition calling upon their school to do the same. In response to Open Hillel, a group of students formed Safe Hillel in 2014 to preserve the pro-Israel agenda of the original Hillel organization. According to its founder Raphael Fils, "Hillel should not have to change its mission in order to accommodate those who don't agree with it. Hillel is the one place students are supposed to feel entirely comfortable in their support of Israel. If that makes some people uncomfortable, there are plenty of other places to go just to hear attacks on Israel."

Princeton University Hillel's executive director, Rabbi Julie Roth was criticized by two Hillel student board members and other members for sending out a mass email encouraging Hillel members to oppose a petition by tenured Princeton faculty members which called on the university to divest from companies that profit from “the occupation of the West Bank by Israel.” Thirty-eight Jewish Princeton students wrote an open letter criticizing the Center for Jewish Life, Princeton's Hillel, for acting as if the center would automatically oppose the faculty's petition without debate. The students' letter, which appeared in the campus newspaper, The Daily Princetonian, also criticized Hillel International for prohibiting member chapters from hosting or engaging in discussion with groups or individuals who promote boycotting, divesting from or sanctioning Israel.
Hillel had also been criticized for monopolistic tactics that the group is alleged to have used to assume primacy over the Jewish campus scene.

Controversies involving individual directors

UCLA Hillel rabbi and director Chaim Seidler-Feller was accused by journalist Rachel Neuwirth of verbally and physically assaulting her on the UCLA campus in October 2003. Eyewitness accounts were contradictory, with some indicating Neuwirth did not provoke the incident, but others indicating that she had. After more than three years of litigation, in a legal settlement, Seidler-Feller provided Neuwirth with a letter of apology accepting full responsibility for the attack on Neuwirth and a large financial arrangement with her.

In 2006, a George Washington Law School student organized an on-campus rally to focus on disinvestment from Israel. In an email sent to students in Hillel, Robert Fishman, director of George Washington University's Hillel, asserted that the rally's organizer is "considered a terrorist by the state of Israel, and has been convicted of crimes in both Israel and the United States. He advocates for the destruction of Israel, and in its place, the creation of a Palestinian state. He has also openly admitted to associating with suicide bombers and has made comments in the past about his desire to become a suicide bomber." All of Fishman's accusations were false.

Robert Fishman also orchestrated a group of Hillel members to read highly critical questions pre-drafted by Deborah Lipstadt as if they were their own to President Jimmy Carter who spoke on campus in March 2007.  Along with blocking the microphones from other students, the activities gave the media the false impression that the audience was critical of Carter despite repeated standing ovations.

See also
Chabad on Campus International Foundation

References

External links
Hillel International Official website

 

Jewish youth organizations
Jewish organizations based in the United States
Jewish organizations established in 1923
International student religious organizations
Articles containing video clips
Non-profit organizations based in Washington, D.C.
Youth organizations based in the United States
Jewish organizations
1923 establishments in Washington, D.C.
501(c)(3) organizations
International Jewish organizations